The 1961 Philippine presidential and vice presidential elections were held on November 14, 1961. Incumbent president Carlos P. Garcia lost his opportunity for a second full term as president of the Philippines to Vice President Diosdado Macapagal. His running mate, Senator Gil J. Puyat, lost to Senator Emmanuel Pelaez. Six candidates ran for president, four of whom got nine votes nationwide together. This was the only election in Philippine electoral history in which a vice-president defeated the incumbent president.

Results

President

Vice-President

See also
Commission on Elections
Politics of the Philippines
Philippine elections
President of the Philippines
5th Congress of the Philippines

External links
 The Philippine Presidency Project
 Official website of the Commission on Elections

1961
1961 elections in the Philippines